Statistics of Kuwaiti Premier League for the 2001–02 season.

Overview
It was competed between 8 teams, and Al Arabi Kuwait won the championship.

League standings

References
Kuwait - List of final tables (RSSSF)

2001–02
1
2001–02 in Asian association football leagues